Drosophila senilis is a species of fly; it is the type species of the subgenus Dudaica.

References 

senilis